The 1976 United States presidential election in Arizona was part of the 1976 United States presidential election, which took place on November 2, 1976, throughout all fifty states and D.C. Voters chose six representatives, or electors to the Electoral College, who voted for president and vice president.

Arizona voted strongly for the Republican nominee, incumbent President Gerald Ford, over the Democratic nominee, Georgia Governor Jimmy Carter. The state turned out to be the sixth most Republican in the nation behind Utah, Idaho, Alaska, Nebraska and Wyoming, as it was already perceived that Carter – highly popular in his native South – lacked any understanding of the environment, economy, culture and political issues of the West.

Carter did improve upon the performance of the preceding Democratic nominee, South Dakota Senator George McGovern, swinging away from the GOP by fifteen percentage points. Gila and Pinal Counties were won back for the Democrats from the previous election, and Carter became the first Democrat to win Apache County since 1964 and the first to carry neighbouring Navajo County since 1948. Nonetheless, Carter became the first ever Democrat to win the White House without carrying Santa Cruz or Yuma Counties.

Results

Results by county

References

1976
1976 Arizona elections
Arizona